WFN may refer to:

 World Fishing Network, a Canadian and American English language TV channel 
 the proprietary font format supplied with versions 1 and 2 of Corel Draw
World Federation of Neurology
 WFN, the National Rail station code for Watford North railway station, Hertfordshire, England